Grassy Creek is a  long 1st order tributary to the Rocky River in Union County, North Carolina.

Course
Grassy Creek rises in a pond about 1 mile northeast of Unionville, North Carolina and then flows northeast to join the Rocky River about 3 miles northwest of New Salem.

Watershed
Grassy Creek drains  of area, receives about 48.0 in/year of precipitation, has a wetness index of 425.52, and is about 36% forested.

References

Rivers of North Carolina
Rivers of Union County, North Carolina